This is a list of hospitals and clinics in Yangon, Myanmar.

Public
 500-bed Specialty Hospital, Yangon
 Defence Services General Hospital (1000-bed)
 Defence Services Orthopaedic Hospital (500-Bed)
 Defence Services Obstetric, Gynaecological and Paediatric Hospital
 East Yangon General Hospital
 Insein General Hospital
 New Yangon General Hospital
 New Yangon Specialist Hospital
 No.2 Military Hospital (500-bed)
 North Okkalapa General Hospital
 South Okkalapa Women and Children Hospital
 Thingangyun Sanpya Hospital
Universities Hospital 
 Waibargi Hospital
 West Yangon General Hospital
 Yangon Central Women's Hospital
 Yangon Children's Hospital
 Yangon ENT Hospital
 Yangon General Hospital
 Yangon Orthopaedic Hospital
 Yangon Workers' Hospital
 Yangon Mental Health Hospital
 Yankin Children's Hospital

Private
 Academy Hospital
 Ar Yu International Hospital
 Asia Royal Hospital
 Aung Yadana Hospital
 Bahosi Hospital
 Chan Myae Mitta
 East West Parami
 Gadayhtay Hospital
 Grand Hantha International Hospital
 Green Cross Hospital
 Guru Nanak Hospital
 Hla Tun Hospice Cancer Foundation
 Jivitadana Sangha Hospital (for Buddhist clergy)
 Kan Thar Yar International Specialist Hospital
 Kwe Kabaw Hospital
 Lumbini Hospital
 Mahar Myaing Hospital
 MMCW
 Muslim Free Dispensary & Medical Relief Society
 Mya Parami Hospital
 Myint Myat Taw Win
 Moe Myittar Hospital
 OSC Hospital
 Pinlon Hospital
 Parami General Hospital
 Pun Hlaing International Hospital
 Rose Hill Hospital
 Sakura Hospital
 Shin Pa Ku
 Shwe Baho
 Shwegondaing Specialist Centre (SSC)
 Shwepadauk Hospital
 Shwe La Min
 Tet Lann Hospital
 Thukha Kabar Hospital
 Thukha Waddy Hospital
 University Avenue Health Centre (UHC)
 Witoriya Hospital
 Yangon Medical Center
Mya Parami Hospital
Byar Dake Pan Hospital
Thukha Waddy Hospital

References

 
Hospitals
Yangon-related lists
Yangon